The following is a list of characters from the fighting game series Tekken. Characters are listed in the alphabetical order.

Characters

Main series
Players can choose from a diverse cast that hails from a variety of ethnic backgrounds and fighting styles. A few characters have supernatural origin, such as Devil and Ogre, while animal characters like Kuma the bear and Roger the kangaroo provide comic relief. In the story mode of the game, each character generally has their own personal reasons for entering the tournament and competing for the prize.

Only two characters have appeared as a playable character in all eight main Tekken installments to date:  Paul Phoenix and Nina Williams (although Kazuya Mishima and Marshall Law also have appeared in all main games but not as playable as they both were not playable in Tekken 3 and they both were replaced by their sons, Jin Kazama and Forest Law respectively). While King also appeared in all the games but as two different characters, with King I appeared in first two games and King II appeared afterwards since the third game.

Four characters: Heihachi Mishima, Kazuya Mishima, Marshall Law and Yoshimitsu would come close, having appeared in seven installments (although Kazuya and Law made cameo appearance in the third game). While Kuma also appeared in seven main games as two different characters, with
Kuma I appeared in first two games and Kuma II appeared in other five games. Jack also have appeared in seven main installments with 7 different models and names (Jack, Jack-2, Gun Jack (Jack-3), Jack-5, Jack-6, Jack-7 and Jack-8), with Tekken 4 being the only game a Jack cyborg was absent from (although a Jack-4 was created, this version was mass-produced instead of only one produced like the other Jack cyborgs, although Jack-4 made cameo appearance in Tekken 5 and appeared as an enemy in the story mode of Tekken 7).

Comparison table

 = Playable and available by default

 = Not included in the game

 = Playable in the update version or unlockable

 = Guest character

 = Cameo appearance

 = Appeared as an enemy

 = Boss character

 = Isn't revealed yet

Notes:

Update version only (console version).
Skin/palette swap.
Playable in console versions only.
Playable boss.
Unlockable.
Unplayable boss.
Unplayable in Tekken 5.
Unlockable in Tekken 5.
Only in Tekken 5: DR.
Only in Tekken 6: BR.
Unlockable in Tekken 5: DR.
Skin/palette swap in Tekken 5.
Playable in a campaign level.
Characters physically appeared in cinematics, or intros, or a trailer, or in a background stage, or in a picture.
The characters are only enemies in a certain mode.
Unplayable in arcade version.
Update version only (arcade version).
Unplayable boss (release date (arcade)) / playable update character (later (arcade)).
Only in Tekken 7: FR (arcade and console)/Round 2.
Only Pre-Order/DLC in console version.
Only playable in story mode for a short amount of time in console version.
Only in Tekken 5.
Only in Devil Within Mode.
Only in story mode in console version.
Only an update in Round 2.
Not playable in Round 2.

Major spin-offs
Bryan Fury, Jin Kazama, Ling Xiaoyu, Paul Phoenix, King II, Mokujin and Nina Williams are the only characters to have appeared in all five major spin-off games. Games highlighted in blue are no longer supported.

Comparison table

 = Playable and available by default

 = Not included in the game

 = Playable in the update version or unlockable

 = Guest character

 = Cameo appearance

 = Appeared as an enemy

 = Boss character

Notes:

Update version only.
Skin/palette swap.
Playable in console versions only.
Playable boss.
Unlockable.
Unplayable boss.
Update and unlockable.
Characters appeared physically in cinematics, or intros, or a trailer, or in a background stage, or in a picture.
The characters are only enemies in a certain mode.
Unplayable in Arcade version.
Unplayable in online mode.
Unlockable in Wii U Edition.
Unlockable if not selected in Adventure Mode.
Only playable in Fight Lab mode for the prologue.

Other games

Nina Williams and Ling Xiaoyu have appeared in eight out of the nine games listed, while Jin Kazama and Paul Phoenix have appeared in seven out of the nine games listed. Games highlighted in blue are no longer supported.

Comparison table

 = Playable and available by default

 = Not included in the game

 = Playable in the update version or unlockable

 = DLC character

 = Cameo appearance

 = Appeared as an enemy

 = Boss character

Notes:

Update version only.
Skin/palette swap.
Playable boss.
Unlockable.
Unplayable character/boss.
Characters appeared physically in cinematics, or intros, or a trailer, or in a background stage, or in a picture.
Only playable in "Anna Mode".

Adaptations

Only Heihachi and Kazuya Mishima have appeared in all five adaptations of the series.

Comparison table

 = Not included

Introduced in Tekken

Anna Williams

Armor King I/II
 was a rival of King when the latter was still an inexperienced wrestler. He suffered eye damage in a fight with King, but when he later found King distraught and drunk in an alleyway, Armor King convinced him to get back into fighting and enter the second King of Iron Fist tournament. After King is killed by Ogre, Armor King trains a new fighter who sports a jaguar mask similar to that of King's. Armor King is not selectable in Tekken 4, as he is beaten to death in a bar fight instigated by Australian brawler Craig Marduk, who then steals his mask and mockingly wears it in the tournament, provoking Armor King's protege King into entering the competition to seek revenge. Marduk is then attacked in Tekken 5 by what is believed to be Armor King, but his assailant is revealed in Tekken 6 as the original Armor King's younger brother. After recovering from a brutal beating where he and Marduk knocked out each other and brought to hospital by King, the younger Armor King accepts Marduk's challenge for a retirement match arranged by King in Tekken 7.

Ganryu
Voiced by: Banjō Ginga (Tekken); Hidenari Ugaki (TK5-present); Takashi Nagasako (TK2-Tekken Tag Tournament; Tekken: The Motion Picture); Lowell B. Bartholomee (Tekken: The Motion Picture, English); Earl Baylon (Tekken: Bloodlines, English)
 is a sumo wrestler who is barred from the sport for infractions such as firebreathing and taunting his opponents. This rejection, coupled with his mounting gambling debts, steers him into a life of crime. Heihachi Mishima hires him as a henchman for the first King of Iron Fist tournament, in which Ganryu loses to Yoshimitsu, who then drains Ganryu's remaining finances and leaves him broke. Kazuya Mishima pays him handsomely for his services in his Mishima Zaibatsu corporation. Ganryu participates in the second tournament as Kazuya's bodyguard, but he also wishes to build his own sumo ring to impress his secret crush, Michelle Chang, but instead, she defeats him in battle and Ganryu returns to Japan. Two decades after the events of Tekken 2, Ganryu opens a sumo stable and trains other wrestlers. However, after seeing Michelle's daughter Julia on television fighting in the fourth tournament, he enters the fifth in hopes of wooing Julia if he is able to recover her lost "Forest Rejuvenation Data" that he eventually finds inside the Mishima Zaibatsu's laboratory, but Julia receives the information and flees before Ganryu can propose marriage. Now faced with a failing restaurant he had opened afterward in Hawaii, Ganryu enters the tournament again in Tekken 6 in attempt to advertise the restaurant and bring in revenue. Unfortunately, Ganryu accidentally donated all his restaurant earnings to Julia's reforestation campaign. In order to fix his financial problems, Ganryu decided to enter the seventh tournament.

Ganryu's occupations have varied in alternate Tekken media; in the animated film Tekken: The Motion Picture, he is Lee Chaolan's bodyguard, and in Tekken: Blood Vengeance, he is a PE teacher at the Mishima Polytechnic School.

GameSpy named Ganryu as one of their "25 Extremely Rough Brawlers" in video gaming: "Ganryu is more of a tragic character as his unrequited love for fellow fighter Julia fuels his brutality." In 2011, Computer and Video Games deemed Ganryu one of the series' "worst ever characters": "If losing some weight and not wearing a massive nappy all the time isn't the first thing you do to attract someone whose mother you've already failed to hit on, then you're doing something terribly, horribly wrong."

Heihachi Mishima

Jack (series)/Prototype Jack

Kazuya Mishima/Devil Kazuya/Kid Kazuya

King I/II

Kuma I/II

Kunimitsu I/II

Lee Chaolan/Violet

Marshall Law

Michelle Chang

Nina Williams/Summer Nina

Paul Phoenix

Wang Jinrei

Voiced by: Tamio Ōki (TK1~TTT); Hu Qian (TK5~TTT2)

 is an elderly man who was a close friend of Heihachi Mishima's father Jinpachi, and lived as a recluse in the Mishima gardens. Wang tutors his distant relative Ling Xiaoyu (who debuts in Tekken 3) in the martial arts at a young age. He draws rival Marshall Law in the first King of Iron Fist Tournament, then enters the second tournament in Tekken 2 in order to fulfill the deceased Jinpachi's wishes of eliminating Heihachi and Jinpachi's grandson Kazuya, who have both followed the path of evil. Wang opts to face all challengers giving way to those adept enough to defeat Kazuya, however Wang was defeated by Jun Kazama during the King of Iron Fist Tournament 2. In Tekken 5, set two decades after Jinpachi's death, Wang receives a letter from Jinpachi, who is actually alive but has been possessed by a demon, having been brought to life after starving to death years previously and requests Wang's participation in the King of Iron Fist Tournament 5, Wang was defeated in the semi-finals of the tournament by Jin Kazama whose purpose was to wipe out the Mishima Family's cursed blood. Wang is currently the oldest playable human character in the Tekken games, being 82 during Tekken 1, 84 in Tekken 2 and 104 in Tekken 5 and 6, respectively.

Yoshimitsu

Introduced in Tekken 2

Angel
Voiced by: Yumi Tōma (TTT1); Yuka Koyama (TTT2)
 is a female supernatural entity and opposite of Devil. According to Tekken series producer Katsuhiro Harada, she is the representation of what is left of the goodness in Kazuya Mishima after he had been controlled by Devil, although she herself is not a part of Kazuya's soul. Her Tekken Tag Tournament 2 profile states that she wields the power to purify things, and carries a compassionate and a cruel side. Angel was a palette swap of Devil in Tekken 2 and Tekken Tag Tournament, but receives a distinct design for Tekken Tag Tournament 2 while her fighting style borrowed from Kazuya and Devil Jin. Because of this, she has a laser attack but it's clearly not a laser from her tiara, it's actually more like a light beam.

Angel's existence is likely the results from the first encounters and strange attractions between Kazuya and Jun Kazama, until Kazuya lost half of his power at time when he unknowingly caused Jun to be pregnant, shortly before Kazuya's defeat by Heihachi in second tournament, then the birth of Jin Kazama.

Baek Doo San

Voiced by: Kaneto Shiozawa (TK2~TTT); Yun Beyong hwa  (TK5 onward); Kyousei Tsukui (Tekken: The Motion Picture; Japanese); Lowell B. Bartholomee (Tekken: The Motion Picture; English)

 is a master of Tae Kwon Do who debuted in Tekken 2 as the sub-boss of Marshall Law. He accidentally kills his father during a sparring session, causing him to destroy several dojos—including Law's—in a fit of rage. He then challenges, and loses to, Law in the second tournament. In Tekken 3, Baek is presumed dead after encountering Ogre, and his student Hwoarang enters the third tournament to avenge his master's supposed death, but Tekken 5 reveals that Ogre had beaten Baek into a yearlong coma. After his recovery, Baek begins teaching traditional Tae Kwon Do at military bases. Hwoarang is drafted into the South Korean military but flees to compete in the fourth tournament, for which he is arrested, but is also informed that Baek is alive. After Hwoarang completes his service, he and Baek enter the fifth tournament to test Hwoarang's skills, but Baek later withdraws after Hwoarang is injured in battle and lays unconscious in the hospital for three days. Once he recovers, Baek and Hwoarang return to Korea, and devote themselves solely to improving their fighting skills. Baek's last playable appearance is in Tekken 6, in which he and Hwoarang enter the tournament together once again.

Bruce Irvin
Voiced by: Peter Harrell, Jr. (Tekken: The Motion Picture; English); Seiji Sasaki (Tekken: The Motion Picture; Japanese); Crispin Freeman (TK5 cutscenes)

 is a muscular and Mohawked American Muay Thai practitioner. He lost his parents and older brother in his youth, and grew up in a violent environment. He longed to make a difference, and became a police officer. He was sent to Japan to investigate the multinational conglomerate Mishima Zaibatsu and its leader, Kazuya Mishima, who knew of Bruce's mission and therefore arranged for his flight to crash. Bruce survives the crash but becomes an amnesiac, and Kazuya hires him as his bodyguard. In Tekken 2, Bruce fought his old police partner Lei Wulong, who had entered the tournament to arrest Kazuya. Bruce was defeated and attempted to escape on another plane, but it somehow exploded later. In truth, Bruce survives and fakes his death off-screen. He is then absent from the series until returning in Tekken 5 as an unlockable character. After becoming reacquainted with Kazuya Mishima in the tournament, Bruce assists Kazuya in taking over G Corporation, a biotech firm, when its Nebraska branch which fully recovers Kazuya from his previous injuries suddenly betrays him. G Corporation then wages war with the Mishima Financial Group, now led by Jin Kazama, and Bruce becomes the captain at G Corporation's private corps and is enlisted by Kazuya to lead the army on battlefields. G Corporation attempts to gain an advantage by placing an enormous bounty on Jin, which results in the staging of the sixth tournament, in which Bruce is selectable from the start and participates in an attempt to capture Jin.

Bruce makes a brief appearance in Tekken: The Motion Picture, serving as Lee Chaolan's bodyguard and fighting Jack-2 on a boat en route to the tournament.

Brenda Brathwaite of The Escapist, in 2008, included Bruce among many black fighting game characters, such as Mortal Kombat's Jax and Street Fighter's Balrog, as "either non-existent or consistent in their overall attributes." Bruce's Tekken 5 render was additionally the lone character illustration that was used for the article.

Jun Kazama/Unknown

Lei Wulong

Roger, Roger Jr. and Alex
Roger family line and Alex are comic-relief characters who make their first appearances in Tekken 2. However, Kazuya considered them worthless and wanted to kill them, but they escaped and met Armor King, who schooled them in wrestling. Alex and Roger compete in the second Iron Fist Tournament, where Jun Kazama, a WWWC wildlife-protection program officer, is dispatched to arrest Kazuya. She finds Roger and Alex and relocates them to a safe location in Australia. After Roger Sr. is abducted by Mishima Zaibatsu, Roger Jr. enters the fifth tournament to find him but discovers that he was not abducted but instead secretly living a luxurious lifestyle. In Tekken 6, Roger Sr., again not playable, and his wife are since divorced but she suffers financial hardship without his presence and currently. She and Roger Jr. both participate in the sixth tournament in hopes of establishing financial security. Roger and Alex both appear in the noncanonical Tekken Tag Tournament and Tekken Tag Tournament 2, in which Roger Jr. is playable in Roger Sr.'s stead. As Tekken Tag Tournament 2 is semi-canon midquel between Tekken 6 and Tekken 7, Alex and Roger Jr.’s endings eventually ties to Roger Sr.’s reconciliation with his family.

Introduced in Tekken 3

Bryan Fury

Crow
Crow is a codename assigned for the lowest ranking members of the Tekken Force (the others, in ascending order, are Falcon, Hawk, and Owl). They appear as enemies in the Tekken Force mini-game. Crow also appears in Tekken Card Challenge as an unlockable character, as well as in Tekken Tag Tournament 2 as non-playable opponents in the Fight Lab mode.

Dr. Bosconovitch

Eddy Gordo

Forest Law
Voiced by: Katsuhiro Harada (TK3-TTT); David Vincent (TTT2)

 is the good-natured son of Marshall Law who made his first appearance in the Tekken series replacing Marshall in Tekken 3. He hopes to duplicate his father's greatness as a fighter but is forbidden by Marshall to enter any contests. However, Forest's friend and sparring partner Paul Phoenix convinces him to enter the third King of Iron Fist Tournament behind his father's back, which causes a rift between Paul and Marshall. Forest is mentioned in Tekken 5 as having been hospitalized after a motorcycle accident, which becomes Marshall's motive for entering the tournament. He is playable in Tekken Tag Tournament in replacement of Marshall and in Tekken Tag Tournament 2 as a console-exclusive character.

Gon
 is a diminutive dinosaur who is the eponymous title character of the manga series and media franchise. He makes a one-time playable guest appearance in the PlayStation version of Tekken 3.

Due to his guest character status, Gon never returns in subsequent Tekken games like Tekken Tag Tournament.

Hwoarang

Jin Kazama/Devil Jin

Julia Chang/Jaycee

Ling Xiaoyu

Mokujin/Tetsujin/Kinjin

Ogre/True Ogre

Tiger Jackson
 is a palette swap of  Eddy Gordo, first appearing in Tekken 3 and returned in the non-canonical Tekken Tag Tournament and in the console version of its sequel, Tekken Tag Tournament 2, now with his own character slot. With a prominent Afro and Blaxploitation design elements, Tiger Jackson was initially one of the unused names and concepts of Eddy Gordo from during the development of Tekken 3. (Gordo was also named "Rally Jackson" during development.) The character's identity is unknown, although many originally interpreted him as an alter ego of Eddy. In Tekken Tag Tournament in Eddy Gordo's ending, they both see that they are two different people. Also the Wii U version of Tekken Tag Tournament 2, which comes with a biography for each character, implies that they are different individuals as the two are "...not at all related."

Tiger also appears in the background of the Pool Party stage of Tekken 5: Dark Resurrection. He is also a character in the game Pac-Man Fever.

Panda

Introduced in Tekken 4

Christie Monteiro

Combot/Super Combot DX
 makes his lone series appearance in Tekken 4 as a general-purpose robot created by Lee Chaolan for the fourth tournament, crafted to be the ultimate fighting machine. It is programmed to learn every fighter's style as it progresses through the tournament. It was also used to increase the chance of Lee gaining the Mishima Zaibatsu if Heihachi were to be defeated by Combot. Production of the prototype was rushed, resulting in glitches such as using only one fighting style at a time while switching through them randomly. The robot utilizes some physical attributes of other characters, such as brandishing Yoshimitsu's sword or having a long tail similar to King's.

Combot is a playable training dummy in Tekken Tag Tournament 2's "Fight Lab" tutorial. Lee (as his alter ego, Violet) completes work on Combot as part of his Super Combot DX Plan. However, Lee is caught up in the success of his handiwork that he neglects to pay attention to the robot and it explodes. He constructs a second model and then kidnaps Heihachi, Jin, and Kazuya as test subjects until Jin destroys it.

Craig Marduk

Miharu Hirano
Voiced by: Eriko Fujimaki (T4), Ayumi Fujimura (TTT2)

 is Ling Xiaoyu's best friend and a student of Mishima Polytechnical High School. She first appeared as an alternate costume of Xiaoyu in Tekken 4, sharing her storyline, special moves, and win animations. She wears a school uniform identical to Xiaoyu's, has short, dark red hair. Miharu was included in the console version of Tekken Tag Tournament 2 as a free update released by Namco on October 9, 2012: in that game, Miharu has a light blue nail polish on her hands and her feet. Despite her TTT2 outfit, which is similar to bikini-like clothing, she can also be customized to resemble the Tekken 4 outfit.

Steve Fox
Voiced by: Ezra J. Stanley (TK4, Western version); Jojo Otani (TK4, Asian version); Guy Perryman (TK5 (dialogues) -present (grunts)); Gideon Emery (TK6-present, English); Masaki Terasoma (2009 live-action film); Yoshimasa Hosoya (Street Fighter X Tekken, Japanese)

 is a British boxer whose mother is Nina Williams and aunt is Anna Williams; she was impregnated via in vitro fertilization and gave birth while held captive by Heihachi Mishima as one of the test subjects for the Doctor Abel's cryogenic sleep studies on the children like Steve to create a perfect Tekken Force's super soldiers. Steve was adopted in his infancy by Emma Kliesen (Leo's mother) until he grew up and was secretly sent to an orphanage by Emma to cover his status from Zaibatsu's eye. This led to the super soldier project being cancelled, and at that time Emma resigned to G Corporation. Steve is one of the survivors, but left a scar on his left arm for the rest of his life from Abel's experiment. Many years later, Steve became a middleweight boxing champion while searching for the truth about his past. While on the run from the Mafia after refusing to throw a fight for them, Steve enters the fourth King of Iron Fist tournament, which he loses but learns that Nina is his mother. During the events of the fifth tournament, Steve succeeds in destroying the Mishima Zaibatsu's research institute. However, his boxing career dries up due to the world war started by Jin Kazama, but he is invited by Marshall Law and Paul Phoenix to train with them in the martial arts. During his training in a boxing gym, his left arm is hurting while also remembering the experiment he had from Mishima Zaibatsu and good memories with Emma. He later found Nina in a chapel during her private undercover mission as a bride to assassinate a certain mob boss (later revealed to be a fiancée of Steve's aunt, Anna Williams from G Corporation), ever since she resigned from Mishima Zaibatsu after Heihachi's return and Jin's presumable disappearance. Once Steve defeated her, Nina explains to her son everything she knows when she was captured by Zaibatsu, led by Heihachi for Abel's experiments. After Steve finally got as much information from his mother as he could, Nina warns him that he will never be her son because she couldn't care less about him. Unfortunately, the Tekken Force are after Nina for leaving Heihachi and being branded a traitor. Steve holds off the Tekken Forces allowing Nina to escape. Steve is playable in Tekken 3D: Prime Edition, Tekken Tag Tournament 2, Tekken Revolution, and Street Fighter X Tekken. His main costumes feature the red, white and blue of the Union Jack.

British actor and musician Luke Goss played Steve in the 2009 Tekken film. His storyline from the games is changed to his being a retired fighter with no relation to Nina and instead becoming the friend and mentor of Jin Kazama after Jin defeats Marshall in the tournament. Steve is later killed by Jackhammers while breaking Jin and other imprisoned participants out of their holding cells.

In 2012, Gelo Gonzales of FHM listed Steve and Street Fighter character Balrog as one of his "10 Awesome Fantasy Fights" for Street Fighter X Tekken: "Balrog's the aggressive, in-your-face, no-nonsense Mike Tyson type. Steve, on the other hand, is a pretty boy British boxer who likes to weave around and counter at the ideal moment." Samuel Riley of GamesRadar ranked Steve fourth in his selection of the "7 baddest boxers in video games" in 2014: "Decked out in Union Jack shorts and a tasty pair of golden gloves, Steve favours punishing body strikes to the precision jab, a high stakes style that metes out as just much pain as it invites."

Introduced in Tekken 5 and Tekken 5: Dark Resurrection

Asuka Kazama/Summer Asuka

Feng Wei

Voiced by: Hiroshi Tsuchida (grunts); Chuan Yin Li (dialogues)

 was raised as a disciple of the God Fist style (神拳 Shinken, based on nanquan). Though he was the top student, Feng killed his master after he was scolded for fighting outside the dojo. Feng seeks the secrets of the God Fist scrolls that were stolen by the Mishima family, leading to his competing in the fifth King of Iron Fist Tournament and his destruction of Asuka Kazama's dojo in the process of his search. and he is ultimately successful in retrieving the scrolls.

It was later revealed that the scrolls did not contain any secret technique but rather an old teaching: "He who destroys all other fighting styles and makes them his own shall become a warrior superior to all men, the Dragon God." Feng then traveled all around the world and defeated many martial artists until he heard rumors of another King of Iron Fist Tournament, which persuades him to join said tournament. He was defeated by Wang Jinrei in the later stages of the tournament, despite first thinking that Feng is arrogant due him not responding when spoken to, Wang starts to respect him after he accepts defeat, and urges him to continue his training. Feng has featured regularly in the series since his Tekken 5 debut.

Jinpachi Mishima

Lili De Rochefort/Summer Lili

Raven
Voiced by: Jack Merluzzi (TK5, also TK6–TTT2 gameplay); D. C. Douglas (TK5:DR–T7 cutscenes and dialogues, Street Fighter X Tekken); Kenji Sugimura (2009 live-action film; Japanese); Kenichiro Matsuda (Street Fighter X Tekken; Japanese)

 is an international intelligence agent who sports a distinctive X-shaped scar across his face. He enters the fifth tournament to seek out those responsible for the event, and witnesses an attack on Hon-Maru by G Corporation's Jack-4 foot soldiers while on a mission to look into the company and Mishima Zaibatsu, as the conglomerates are warring with each other. During the tournament, he crosses paths with Kazuya Mishima, who he recognizes after seeing him flying away from the Hon-Maru. He loses to Kazuya and is interrogated by him. Afterwards Kazuya discovers that he was betrayed by G Corporation, and that something was awakened from under Hon-Maru. Kazuya realizes what Heihachi has done, and speculates that, in fact, it is his grandfather Jinpachi Mishima, who is somehow controlling the Zaibatsu now. Sometime after the King of Iron Fist Tournament 5, Raven encounters Heihachi Mishima, who was presumed to be dead, they began to fight.

Before a winner could be decided, Raven received orders to return to headquarters, and he had to withdraw from the battle.

After that encounter, Raven was then sent to investigate the Mishima Zaibatsu once again via the sixth tournament. Raven is a featured character in Tekken 6's "Scenario Campaign" story mode, first appearing as an enemy boss defeated by Lars Alexandersson and Alisa Bosconovitch. He later helps Alisa and Lars escape from a rampaging NANCY robot, then Lars’ last journeys after Alisa was revealed to be Jin's monitor to spy on Lars. It is also revealed he is in a contact with Lars’ friend Tougou, entrusted him his tag give it to Lars as a remembrance, should Tougou died in battle. After Jin reveal his main reason on starting a world war, and apparently sacrifice himself to destroy Azazel, Raven and his men found Jin's comatose body, and begin to carry him to the UN via chopper.

Unfortunately during Tekken 7 event where Raven's team was carrying Jin's body, they lost the boy, due to the latter's Devil Gene went haywire and took over his body. According to Master Raven's character episode, it is suggested that Raven survive the chopper crash and needs to be “retrained”.

He appears with Yoshimitsu as a playable unit in Street Fighter X Tekken.

Raven was portrayed by Darrin Henson in the 2009 live-action film Tekken. He defeats Eddy Gordo in the tournament and offers advice to Jin Kazama before the latter's fight with Bryan Fury.

Sergei Dragunov/Halloween Dragunov
Voiced by: Kenichi Morozumi (TK5:DR–TK7); Noriyoshi Katsunuma (2009 live-action film)

  is a Russian Spetsnaz soldier who practices Sambo and is nicknamed "White Angel of Death" due to his fighting prowess. While investigating a mysterious body found in Siberia, Dragunov receives special orders from an unknown party supposedly regarding Devil Jin and enters the fifth tournament to carry them out, but Tekken 6 reveals that his mission is unsuccessful because he was defeated by Raven in the early stages of the tournament. As a result of the ongoing world war caused by Jin, now the new owner of the Mishima Zaibatsu, Dragunov competes in the sixth King of Iron Fist Tournament to capture Jin and bring down the organization. Dragunov shares a rivalry with Raven that includes having inflicted his facial scar. Save for battle grunts, the character has no dialogue in any of his in-game appearances.

Dragunov has a halloween version names Halloween Dragunov who's introduced in Tekken Mobile. Halloween Dragunov has the same fighting style and the same Rage Art like Dragunov.

Dragunov is portrayed by martial artist and actor Anton Kasabov In the 2009 live-action Tekken film, in which he has no dialogue. He participates in the Iron Fist tournament and is killed in battle by Bryan Fury.

Introduced in Tekken 6 and Tekken 6: Bloodline Rebellion

Alisa Bosconovitch

Azazel
Voiced by: Richard Epcar (story mode)

 is the main antagonist of Tekken 6, and the source that created the devil gene, set to be released from his tomb after the clash of "two evil stars" (Jin and his father Kazuya). He is the physical embodiment of the spirit resonating within Jin's psyche that is affected by his struggles with his father Kazuya (the "two evil stars"). Azazel has blue-gray skin, a large spiked tail and huge crystalline spikes protruding from his forearms, and wears a ceremonial headdress and loincloth. His offensive attacks range from summoning giant crystal stalagmites from the ground to unleashing scarab beetles onto his opponents. Azazel appears in the final stage of Tekken 6's story mode, brought forth by Jin so he can defeat him and end his own life in the process. Azazel is defeated not by Jin but by Lars Alexandersson and Raven, but Jin reveals that Azazel can only be permanently vanquished by someone carrying the Devil Gene. Jin powers up with his Devil form, making him immune to Azazel's attacks. Jin kills Azazel by punching his fist straight through his chest but both fall and disappear into the temple ruins.

Despite losing its physical form, the weakened essence of Azazel's soul is still alive and immediately being sealed by Zafina into her orb, at cost of having her left arm cursed with its power. The more it suppressed too long, the more Azazel's soul recovering and stronger, possibly reviving him, unless a Kazuya's next last battle against Jin after murdering Heihachi had to be stopped. When Tekken 7 occur, Zafina sought Claudio to prevent the possible return of Azazel.

Azazel has received critical reception for his difficulty as a final boss. Lucas Sullivan of GamesRadar included him in his 2014 selection of twelve "unfair" fighting-game bosses. "Hated that mutated old guy [Tekken 5 boss Jinpachi], huh? Here, have a fire-breathing crystal dragon that's as tall as the screen." Rick Marshall of MTV said in 2009, "As far as boss battles go, Azazel is the most difficult the franchise has ever offered—even on 'Easy' mode." Stephen Nadee of WhatCulture named Azazel the number-one "worst" fighting game boss in 2013: "Understanding the game mechanics mean almost nothing when it comes to fighting Azazel particularly when he has his advantage in defense, his moves are fairly difficult to sidestep, and can counter-attack through his own blocking." Eric Neigher of GameSpy wrote in his 2009 review of the game's PlayStation Portable release: "Azazel, Tekken 6's official nemesis, is perhaps the most badly designed, frustrating to play against, and overall worst boss ever."

Bob Richards/Slim Bob/Summer Bob
Voiced by: Patrick Seitz (TK6–present); Tsutomu Isobe (Street Fighter X Tekken, Japanese)
Making his debut in Tekken 6, simply known as Bob, is an American martial artist who participated in numerous fighting competitions but lacked power against larger opponents. He therefore fattened himself up to the point of morbid obesity while maintaining his previous speed, then entered the sixth tournament to silence his doubters. A thin version of the character, called "Slim Bob", is included in Tekken Tag Team Tournament 2 as a download, while the original Bob was added to the roster of the 2016 Tekken 7 update. Bob has a summer version names Summer Bob who's introduced in Tekken Mobile. Summer Bob has the same fighting style and the same Rage Art like Bob.

Reception to the character has been mixed, mainly due to his design. Robert Workman of GameDaily ranked Bob the tenth "ugliest game character" in 2008: "If the bright red shirt covering the gigantic frame isn't insulting enough, he also has a bleach blonde mop on his head."  In 2010, GamesRadar proposed a fantasy fight between Bob and Street Fighter's Rufus for Street Fighter X Tekken: "How two totally different companies [Namco and Capcom] decided they both needed speedy fat asses in their games at exactly the same time is something of a mystery, though ... we feel there's room for both of them." Complex ranked Bob among the "25 Most Badass Fat Guys in Games" in 2011. In 2012, Jeff Marchiafava of Game Informer deemed Bob one of the most "ridiculous" Tekken characters: "Bob is from America. Bob is also morbidly obese. That's pretty much all the thought Namco put into Bob."

Lars Alexandersson

Leo Kliesen
Voiced by: Philipp Zieschang (TTT2, TK7 [German, dialogues])

 is a Bajiquan practitioner from Germany whose father was a world-famous spelunker and whose mother Emma a G Corporation executive. Though their father disappeared during an expedition, Leo still wanted to follow his career path, until their mother was murdered by an unknown assailant. When the police abruptly call off the investigation, Leo opt to seek the truth alone, during which the G Corporation's Kazuya Mishima materializes as a person of interest. It was at this time that Leo learned of the Mishima Zaibatsu sponsoring The King of Iron Fist Tournament, at which Mishima planned to appear, and he decides to enter the competition in hopes of gaining access to him. In the Tekken Tag Tournament 2 ending, Leo infiltrates a train owned by G Corporation and learns that their mother was involved with Mishima Zaibatsu twenty years before, heading a project called "Hybrid Gene". The Tekken Tag 2 ending story in regarding of their mother's former job as a researcher in Zaibatsu is continued in Tekken 7. In Tekken Comic, Leo is male and Lili Rochefort's bodyguard, accompanying her to Osaka to shoot a martial arts film.

Namco attempted to cater to both male and female players with the character's shortened name and ambiguous design of short blonde hair and non-revealing clothing. Series producer Katsuhiro Harada revealed Leo's full name (Eleonore) at the 2011 Tekken: Blood Vengeance premiere in Cologne, Germany. He, however, did a comment on the character saying that "Leo was female during developing". This however cause fans quite debate concerning Leo's gender, as they have been misunderstood to think that Leo was officially confirmed as a female since that TTT2 provided Leo with a bikini and a male surfer suit. He stated that the video about Leo's gender revealing in Germany has been modified by being cut back and forth. He confirmed that Leo's sex and gender always have been unknown and that the truth was still in the darkness. He explained also the TTT2 swimsuits situation saying that "They are for those who see Leo as female and for those who see Leo as male". He then affirmed that he's frustrated because Leo is always translated and referred with 'she'. Making Tom Goulter of GamesRadar said in a 2012 feature on the Tekken characters, "Choose this character if anyone tries to tell you that video games are all about enforcing restrictive gender binaries."

Miguel Caballero Rojo
Voiced by: Liam O'Brien (TK6 (dialogues) -present (grunts)) Daichi Endō (2009 live-action film), Héctor Garay (TTT2–present (Spanish, dialogues))

At the age of fifteen, Spanish brawler  was kicked out of the house by his parents for constantly fighting. He ran away and sought sanctuary inside a bar, where his sister, with whom he was extremely close, would visit him in secret. However, she is later killed on her wedding day after a group of Mishima Zaibatsu fighter jets launch an airstrike on the church where the ceremony was being held. Miguel's investigation leads to the sixth tournament in order to seek answers from the corporation's CEO, Jin Kazama. Unfortunately, Jin suddenly disappeared, Miguel's life purpose to kill him also disappears. From that point forward, Miguel began to wander like a living specter from battle-torn town to another. Until one day, he is confronted by now ex-Zaibatsu leader Jin, with Miguel's purpose to kill him rise again. However, Jin held back and let Miguel finish, but Miguel refuse and spared, telling Jin that he will kill him once Jin has found hope without dying earlier yet. His early appearances resemble that of a bullfighter, but his design was simplified in Tekken 7 to an open red shirt and green combat trousers. He has no formal training in the martial arts. In Tekken 7, Miguel's 'Rage art' is somewhat unique in that the camera switches to a first person perspective from the opponents point of view, giving Miguel's violent beat down a particularly brutal feel.

Miguel has a minor role in the 2009 Tekken  live-action film, and was played by Roger Huerta. He is defeated in the tournament by Jin.

NANCY-MI847J
NANCY-MI847J is a massive robotic security unit under the command of Jin Kazama. It is very difficult to destroy and possesses an arsenal of missiles and lasers. NANCY only appears in Tekken 6's arcade mode and "Time Attack" Mode as a bonus round battle before the player fights Jin. In the story mode, the robot is controllable in one level of the story mode when the player attempts infiltration of G Corporation's headquarters. NANCY is revealed to be the very first character that utilizes Wall Bound, which soon applied in Tekken 7, starting from guest character Geese Howard in Season 1, then all characters as of Season 2.

Steve West of Cinema Blend said about the character's fighting style: "NANCY doesn't react like a typical Tekken opponent. Rather than block your puny attempts to damage it, the robot will simply attack you whenever it feels like it." Dale North of Destructoid commented in 2008: "Where do [Namco] get these [character] names? Bob and Nancy? That sounds like a Middle-American suburban couple."

Zafina
Voiced by: Cindy Robinson

 (زافينا) is a Middle Eastern woman, probably of Egyptian descent. She was born into an ancient bloodline of dispellers of evil and possesses spiritual powers. Raised as a warrior and serving as her clan's assassin, she uses her spiritual gifts on the side working as an astrologist. Zafina is tasked with guarding a sealed royal tomb that believed to maintain the clan's well-being, and she has defeated all who have tried to infiltrate it. She prophesies the clash of two "evil stars" (Jin Kazama and Kazuya Mishima) who will bring about the world's end. Zafina, therefore, travels to the Far East, where Jin and Kazuya are predicted to meet. In Tekken 6's "Scenario Campaign" story mode, Zafina allies herself with Lars Alexandersson and Raven against the Tekken Force, and gives them the location of Azazel's Temple.

In Tekken 7, she has a new design and has gained possession of Azazel's Orb (as seen on Devil Jin's Tekken 6 ending), giving her Azazel-like powers to the hand she's holding as the orb seems to be still holding the demon's essence. She sought Claudio for an assistant to suppress the seal of Azazel's essence from his possible return.

Introduced in Tekken Tag Tournament 2

Sebastian
Voiced by:  (TTT2)

 is Lili's butler who made his debut as a playable character in Tekken Tag Tournament 2 as part of a free update on October 9, 2012. He previously appeared as an unplayable character in Lili's Tekken 5: Dark Resurrection and Tekken 6 endings. Sebastian also appears alongside Lili in the game Digimon World Re:Digitize with his trained Angemon.

Sebastian utilizes Lili's moveset, sharing many of her moves including the ones from Tekken 5: Dark Resurrection that were removed in the current releases.

Introduced in Tekken Revolution

Eliza

 is a vampire who made her debut in the free-to-play spin-off Tekken Revolution. She was one of the ten character choices in a poll to determine the new character addition for the game; she was eventually voted number one most wanted character, ahead of Sexy Female Tekken Force and Shin Kamiya at San Diego Comic Con 2013, ensuring her inclusion to the game. According to her backstory, Eliza is a
powerful and immortal vampire who had existed since more than 1000 years ago. One day after escaping from one of the members of ancient time's Sirius organization, whom Claudio Serafino descendant to, with the intention of taking a nap inside her coffin, she accidentally fell into a deep sleep for hundreds of years. In present-day Monaco, the Rochefort family built a mansion above her coffin, thus imprisoning her, which was also meant for her shelter from being chased by each descendant of the ancient time's Sirius members. She eventually woke up and managed to escape recently and plan an exact revenge on the present day Sirius organization.  Eliza still has difficulty in controlling her sleep and will fall asleep even in the middle of fights; however, she can potentially recover her health while doing so.

Tekken 7 is her main series playable debut, where she utilizes a similar playstyle to Akuma from Street Fighter, such as having 2D-area fighting game mechanics like jumping attacks and special cancels, and Street Fighter-styled Super meter, referred to as a "Blood" gauge. Her sleeping mechanic has also been reworked, allowing her to build her "Blood" gauge rather than recovering health.

Eliza's fighting style incorporates several supernatural moves (such as teleportation). She can also shoot a grounded energy wave that goes straight, although unlike Jinpachi's fireball, it is blockable.

Introduced in Tekken 7 and Tekken 7: Fated Retribution

Akuma

Voiced by: Taketora
Hailing from Capcom's Street Fighter series, Akuma makes a special guest appearance in Tekken 7: Fated Retribution. In the story, Kazumi saves his life when he suffers an unknown critical injury. Shortly thereafter, Kazumi asks him to find and kill Heihachi and Kazuya should she perish. Akuma agrees, claiming that this will settle the debt that he owes her. Akuma retains many of his abilities from the Street Fighter games, such as his Gohadoken, Shakunetsu Hadoken, Gou Shoryuken, Tatsumaki Zankukyaku, Zanku Hadoken, Hyakkishu, and Ashura Senku, along with Messatsu Gou Hadou as his Super Move and Shin Shun Goku Satsu as his Rage Art. Akuma is the first character to possess an exclusive game mechanic in the form of the EX/Super meter and Focus Attack from Street Fighter IV, which replaces his Rage Drive. This meter mechanic was also given to Eliza from Tekken Revolution following her introduction to the game. He is the only guest character in the story mode of Tekken 7.

Prior to Akuma's inclusion, Morrigan Aensland from Capcom's Darkstalkers series was also considered for Tekken 7, but was cut due to animation-related difficulties.

Claudio Serafino
Voiced by: Diego Baldoin (T7), Kohsuke Toriumi (Pachi-Slot T4)
 is a white-clad man hailing from Italy. He is a leader of a secret Anti-Devil organization in combating the Devil Gene's threat, known as Archers of Sirius. Empowered with a Sirius magic, he has tattoos around his left eye and black tapes covering his right arm, which can project and shoot blue lights/boost during battles. He is one of the playable characters in the first location tests of Tekken 7. During an interview with Harada, it was said that Claudio was created to counter the Devil Gene's reign, thus would play an important role in the game.

The reason behind his organization's secret from the public and a sudden disclosure is not yet known at this point. Some time later, Claudio's organization was approached by the Mishima Zaibatsu, led by Heihachi Mishima, to join their conglomerate. However, the archers refused and the Mishima Zaibatsu continues to attempt to persuade them. Having noticed some suspicious acts by Heihachi and his Zaibatsu, Claudio was prompted to investigate the reasons behind the Mishima Zaibatsu's persuasion, even though his uneasy service with Heihachi is temporary. During his alliance with the Mishima Zaibatsu, he met Ling Xiaoyu. After learning about her connection to Jin Kazama, Claudio decides to use her as bait to capture Jin. He later gains assistance from a fortune teller, Zafina, who is currently cursed by an orb of a fully weakened Azazel, in order to prevent the monster's full return through stopping a continued war between Jin and Kazuya after the latter killed Heihachi in their last fight.

Fahkumram
Voiced by: Aphichat Samutsiri
Fahkumram is a very tall, tattooed, strong and muscular man from Thailand. He is a legendary Muay Thai champion and the national hero of Thailand. The scars he received were a result from being stricken by lightning at age 12, with Fahkumram somehow surviving and obtaining superhuman abilities, as well as growing over two meters tall. He eventually becomes a champion at the age of 18 and grows into an honorable family man who cares for his family, including his daughter who looks up to him. Unfortunately, at the age of 24, his life was to take a dramatic turn for the worse. Corrupt officials attempt to lure and use Fahkumram as a slave for their illegal activities, even taking his family hostage after Fahkumram is falsely arrested for defending himself against and killing his would-be assassins (who also rigged his last official match). These events cause him to become more cynical and deluded by his country's corruptions. When the war between the Mishima Zaibatsu and G Corporation occurs four years later, the corrupt government dispatches Fahkumram primarily to eliminate the Zaibatsu by enlisting him for the seventh King of Iron Fist Tournament; Fahkumram hopes to use this as an opportunity to save his family, should he win liberty once and for all.

Geese Howard

Voiced by: Richard Epcar (dialogue), Kong Kuwata (special move dialogues)
 is an American martial artist who serves as the reigning crime boss of the city of South Town. Originating in SNK's fighting game series Fatal Fury, Art of Fighting and The King of Fighters, he appears as the second guest character to be included in Tekken 7 and the second downloadable fighter for the console and PC versions after Eliza.  In the trailer for his addition to the cast, Geese's disembodied voice calls out to a meditating Heihachi Mishima, taunting him with the suggestion that he surrender his plan of worldwide conquest before Geese, due to the world being too big for the old Mishima to control and presumably predicting his death at the hands of his son and now G Corporation CEO, Kazuya.

In a similar vein to the fellow guest character Akuma, whose gameplay uniquely incorporates its own version of Street Fighter IV's Focus Attack and EX/Super meter mechanics, Geese's gameplay mechanics derive from his appearance in The King of Fighters XIV, utilizing his own unique MAX Mode to access specific EX moves and being able to cancel normal and command moves into this state.  Like Akuma, Geese does not possess a Rage Drive, but similar to how the former can expend his Super meter to perform the Messatsu Gou Hadou, Geese has access to two Super Moves ("Climax Arts" in KoF XIV), which are Raging Storm and Raigou Reppuken. Geese is also the only character to have two Rage Arts, his first being Rashōmon, now initiated with a regular attack instead of a counter-throw, and the second his infamous 10-button combination input super, Deadly Rave. Prior to the Season 2 update, he was the only character to have a wall-bounce mechanic. His Rashomon attack from Tekken 7 is eventually being applied in The King of Fighters XV.

Gigas
 is a hulking, red-skinned humanoid who appears to have cybernetics attached to his otherwise nude body. His fighting style is "Destructive Impulse". He was one of the characters whose existence was leaked before being officially revealed as the second new character added post-launch of Tekken 7. Gigas was revealed to be created by a research team in the development of biotechnological weapons. Gigas was sent in the tournament to tests his fighting capabilities. It is hinted in both his own and Katarina's endings that he might be Katarina Alves' adoptive father, who is kidnapped by G Corp and mutated into Gigas.

Josie Rizal

Katarina Alves
Voiced by: Thaís Durães
 is a Brazilian woman who practices the art of savate. She is described as a "sassy, mouthed talker", as well as a beginner-friendly character, with simple strings to execute combos. Along with Claudio, she is one of the characters available in the first location tests of Tekken 7.

She is currently searching for her missing adoptive father, who happens to be G Corporation's brainwashed monster known as Gigas, as seen on her and Gigas' ending.

Katarina seems to be very confident in her abilities as a fighter; alongside her cocky attitude, her fighting pose has her guard totally lowered (contrary to a traditional savate stance), and her posture is completely relaxed.

Kazumi Mishima/Devil Kazumi
Voiced by: Yumi Hara
, née , is married to Heihachi and the mother of Kazuya, the adoptive mother of Lee Chaolan, the daughter-in-law of Jinpachi Mishima, and also the paternal grandmother of Jin Kazama. She serves as the final boss in the arcade mode of Tekken 7, but was eventually replaced with Akuma when certain conditions have been met. Before Tekken 7, she was only alluded to twice: once in Heihachi's stage in Tekken 2, in which her and Heihachi's names are written on the floorboard of the temple in the style of Aiaigasa (a romantic expression to show love between couples), as well as in the non-canon OVA Tekken: The Motion Picture, in which she is mentioned to have died shortly after giving birth to Kazuya. She is seen in a photo inside a locket, cradling baby Kazuya. The debut trailer of Tekken 7 features Kazumi appearing in person for the first time, with her and Heihachi's Aiaigasa-stylized name also shown. Prior to becoming the seventh time release character added to Tekken 7, her human form was playable, yet her devil form remains unplayable. You can also play her devil form as a cheat; the opponent Kazumi will be in her human form, even if you beat her once. Because of this, even when players set the round number from the game options, the 5th stage will be 2 instead of 1.

Kazumi's fighting style is Hachijo Style Karate, which is very similar to the Mishima Style Karate as practiced by the rest of her family, with additional tiger-summoning and levitating ability akin to Jinpachi Mishima. As a final boss, Kazumi is fought in two phases; upon beating her once, she transforms into a stronger phoenix-like white Devil form and remains that way for the duration of the stage. In her devil form, besides having the original devil's powers of third eyed Devil Blaster and wings, her tiger-summoning ability is enhanced, and the tiger's color itself changes to white. Upon beating her once as Devil Kazumi, rather than transforming into a stronger white Devil form, she fights back randomly.

In the story, Kazumi first meets Heihachi when she visits Jinpachi's dojo to train with him. Both Heihachi and Kazumi grow closer and eventually marry, with Kazumi giving birth to Kazuya. Five years later, Kazumi suddenly grows sick; her illness passes quickly, but Kazumi begins behaving differently, exhibiting signs of a split personality, likely due to the awakening of her Devil Gene. During this time, Kazumi saves Akuma's life. After he recovers, Kazumi asks Akuma to find and kill Heihachi and Kazuya should she perish. Akuma agrees, claiming that this will settle the debt that he owes Kazumi. Many days later, Kazumi suddenly attempts to kill Heihachi, revealing that the reason she married him is because her clan foresaw his attempted world domination in the future and sent her to kill him. However, Heihachi proves stronger and, realizing the woman he loved is gone, regretfully kills her in self-defense.

Leroy Smith
Voiced by: Dave Fennoy (TK7), Yasuhiro Kikuchi (Tekken: Bloodline; Japanese), Krizz Kaliko (Tekken: Bloodline; English)
 is an African-American martial artist from New York City. During his childhood, escalating gang violence leads to the Big Apple War, a massive battle between rival gangs that results in many civilian casualties, including Leroy's family. Leroy is also injured in the conflict, falling into a river and being washed out to sea before being found by a merchant ship. With nowhere to return to, Leroy travels the world as a trader before settling in Hong Kong to learn the Wing Chun martial art. Nearly a half-century later, Leroy returns to New York to take revenge on the gangsters and the Mishima Zaibatsu, whom he learns were responsible for the events leading to the Big Apple War. He also has a pet pit-bull dog named "Sugar", that can assist Leroy in his battles.

Although Leroy did not appear in Tekken 3, he appears in Season 1 of retold animated series Tekken: Bloodline, where Jin unintentionally injured his knee during their match, which also led him to gain a cane he used as a temporary weapon in the game's main story. Following the match, Leroy also warns Jin about Heihachi's true purpose like how it affects Kazuya, leading Jin to seeks a tournament veteran, Paul for an answer about who Kazuya was like.

The Game Award 2022 trailer of Tekken 8 reveals that Leroy opens a coffee shop, as seen in the game's Midtown's Time Square stage.

Lidia Sobieska
Voiced by: Aleksandra Nowicka
 is a Polish karateka who became prime minister at young age. She was first announced at Japan Fighting Game Publishers Roundtable 2, 2021 as both second and last fighter of Tekken 7 Season 4.

Her grandfather was once the prime minister of their country before her. The reason she became her grandfather's successor at a young age immediately, is because her father was killed in a helicopter crash in which someone attempted an assassination on her grandfather, this being the main reason she entered the political world. Due to having had spent too long with martial arts prior to entering the political world, she sometimes slips into speaking like she is in the dojo whilst on the phone with her aide during her political career. After receiving a letter from Heihachi, but knowing he would be planning a hostile takeover on her country, she enters The King of Iron Fist tournament to defend her people. However, combined by the seventh tournament's cancellation and Heihachi's true death at the hands of Kazuya, what become the fate of Lidia's home country is unknown.

Lucky Chloe

Master Raven
Voiced by: Sorcha Chisholm

 is a female superior of the original Raven, debuted in Tekken 7: Fated Retribution through time release. In a battle, she carries a sword similar to Yoshimitsu.

Negan Smith

Voiced by: Jeffrey Dean Morgan
He is the leader of the Saviors, a group of roughly 1,000 survivors in the Sanctuary that enslaves other survivor communities, and forces them to pay tribute to him. He fights using "Lucille", a baseball bat wrapped in barbed wire, named after his late wife.

Negan is the fourth guest character to appear in Tekken 7, and was added as part of the second season of downloadable content. Negan is also the second guest character to originate from a comic after Gon in Tekken 3, and the first guest character who was not created by a Japanese publisher. He is modeled after and voiced by Jeffrey Dean Morgan, who portrays the character on the television series. For an unknown reason, he was not included in Round 2 arcade port of Fated Retribution.

Noctis Lucis Caelum

Voiced by: Tatsuhisa Suzuki
,  for short, the prince of the kingdom of Lucis and the main protagonist of Square Enix's role-playing game Final Fantasy XV. He appears as the third guest character in Tekken 7.  In the trailer for his appearance in the game, he is one of Lars' acquaintances, and the two enjoy time fishing together. In Tekken 7, Rather than being voiced by English cast, such as Noctis’ English voice actor Ray Chase, he and the rest of Final Fantasy cast being voice in Japanese instead.

Noctis' gameplay is slightly different amongst both the regular and guest fighters of Tekken 7. He is a standard Tekken-style character who can also utilize the meter-style characters' (Akuma, Eliza, Geese) jump-in attacks. His main power is to summon a variety of different weapons during battle, while utilize some magic attacks and artillery.

Fellow Final Fantasy XV characters Ignis Scientia, Gladio Amicitia, Prompto Argentum, Cindy Aurum, Cid Sophiar and a Chocobo make non-playable cameo appearances on Noctis' home stage, the Hammerhead gas station.

Shaheen
Voiced by: Fadi Rifai

Shaheen is a Saudi Arabian man wearing a shemagh and agal on his head. He also wields a scimitar around his waist. Shaheen was designed by illustrator NINNIN, one of several character designers and illustrators employed to create character designs for Tekken 7, with help from community feedback on social media, particularly those from Saudi Arabia. The character drew attention from the Middle Eastern mainstream press, being featured in publication medias from several countries, including Bahrain and Saudi Arabia.

Shaheen is a bodyguard for a private military company, tasked with protecting key figures in the world. It is said that under his guard, no one has come to be attacked.  However, one day a friend to Shaheen who was a top figure in the oil industry was mysteriously found dead.  Although it was reported as an accidental death, Shaheen always had his doubts.  Sometime later, G Corporation acquires the PMC employing him and everyone that Shaheen was previously familiar with ended up resigning after the acquisition.  Having figured that all of this was too much of a coincidence, Shaheen decided to investigate and find out the truth of what is really going on by confronting the corporation's CEO and a suspect of his, Kazuya.  After Shaheen defeats Kazuya and offers to make peace instead of taking revenge, in honor of his deceased friend, Kazuya refuses the truce and flies away in his Devil form, to Shaheen's surprise.  Now realizing how abominable Kazuya is, Shaheen sets out to apprehend Kazuya when they encounter each other again and avenge his friend's death.

Introduced in Tekken Mobile

Isaak
Isaak is a free-to-play character in Tekken Mobile. His nationality and fighting style are unspecified. He has short blonde hair, wears a jacket with lightly shredded jeans.

Revenant
Revenant is a non-playable boss. He is a paranormal being masked in heavy gear, and comes from an unknown country. He is an enemy of Kazuya, and mimics his fighting style.

Rodeo
Bo "Rodeo" Montana is an all-American fighter. He was a star athlete in college, captain of the football team, and a military soldier with a flawless combat record. While in the army, his squad was ambushed by Revenant, leaving them with their "life force" stripped. He soon becomes a fighter to exact revenge on Revenant, and in turn, restore his comrades lives.

Ruby
Ruby is a female biker who has a fighting style similar to Paul Phoenix.

Tiger Miyagi
Tiger Miyagi is a kung-fu fighter from an unspecified part of Asia. His first outfit has him with plaited long black hair, while his second outfit gives him very short hair.

Yue
Yue is a female Asian fighter who practices generic martial arts. She heavily resembles Pai Chan, a playable character in fighting game Virtua Fighter.

Non-playable characters
The following lists the non-playable characters (NPC) that appear in the series. While they do not participate in the tournament or even are not fighters in any way, they still influence the story, particularly in its characters.

Asuka's father
The father of Asuka Kazama and a relative to Jun Kazama (a.k.a. Mr. Kazama) is a martial art master who practices Kazama Style Traditional Martial Arts which he teaches at his family's dojo located near Osaka. He also taught this martial art to his daughter, Asuka, who is an assistant teacher at his dojo. He is a relative of Jun Kazama, although to what extent their relationship goes is unknown. Before the events of Tekken 5, the arrogant God Fist Kung-Fu prodigy, Feng Wei, traveled through Japan to find the God Fist scroll, destroying many dojo along the way. The Kazama's dojo was one of his targets, as Feng easily defeated Asuka's father and his students, before destroying their dojo, causing him to be incapitated. This incident caused Asuka to participate in the fifth tournament to take revenge on Feng. While he is unseen in the main video game series, he does make an appearance in the non-canonical Tekken Comic, set during the events of Tekken 6.

Dr. Abel
 is a mad scientist who works for Mishima Zaibatsu alongside his rival, Dr. Bosconovitch. He revives the deceased Bryan Fury by reanimating him into a cyborg. Abel sent Bryan to Tournament 3 to collect mechanical data from Bosconovitch for his plans to build a cyborg army. After the second tournament, Abel abandoned Bryan and attempted to kill a would be G Corporation's scientist Jane with his satellite death ray, seeing her as a potential threat to his evil plan. However, a Jack-2 whom Jane met shielded her from his attacks, thus destroying him instead. When Jane break into the Mishima Zaibatsu's labs and revives her Jack-2 into Gun Jack, Abel attempt kill both of them twice, but Jane was able to implemented an energy shield on Gun Jack, thereby saving their lives. Later, Bryan was in a state of despair when his life was expiring after Dr. Abel left him died. Between Tekken 2 and Tekken 3 Abel was also involved on experimenting children into child soldiers using Devil Gene research under Heihachi's orders, with a British boxer Steve Fox is one of the surviving children whose deaths had been faked and hiding from Heihachi's watch for years thanks to the former Zaibatsu researcher Emma Kliesen, Leo Kliesen's now late-mother. At the end of Tournament 4, Bryan found Abel and punched him across the room, killing him instantly, shortly before Yoshimitsu brought a dying Bryan to Doctor Bosconovitch. As Abel's death-ray is now belonged to Mishima Zaibatsu, during his time working with Heihachi, it is last used by Heihachi to record Kazuya's battle in his devil form against Akuma at G Corporation Tower worldwide, then use it to kill them. However, both Kazuya and Akuma survived the blast, whereas Kazuya uses his Devil Blaster to destroy Abel's satellite and makes the public to forget his demonic existence, until Heihachi have no choice to secretly entrust the truth to Lars and Lee through letting the journalist they hired interview with him about how Mishima feud first started.

Emma Kliesen
 is the mother of Leo. She worked as an executive of G Corporation. Her husband disappeared when Leo was still a child. Some time before the events of Tekken 6, Emma was murdered by an unknown assailant who is suspected to be sent by her superior, Kazuya Mishima, thus sparking Leo's quest to take revenge against Kazuya. In both Leo and Steve Fox's endings in Tekken Tag Tournament 2, it is revealed that Emma once worked for Mishima Zaibatsu twenty years ago and that she was the supervisor of the "Hybrid Gene" program conducted by Heihachi Mishima, which consisted of injecting subjects who could withstand the fatal impact of the Devil Gene. One of the subjects, Steve, then known as NT01, was taken in by Emma, who reported his disappearance as death. After briefly taking care of him, Emma left Steve to be adopted in England.

Hawk, Falcon, and Owl
Hawk, Falcon and Owl are codenames assigned for the lowest ranking members of the Tekken Force. They appear as enemies in the Tekken Force mini-game in both Tekken 3. In Tekken 3 you can play it with a cheat.

Jack-4

Jane
Voiced by: Eri Sendai (Tekken: The Motion Picture (Japanese)), Erin Fitzgerald (TK6), Jessica Schwartz (Tekken: The Motion Picture (English))

 is a scientist working for G Corporation. As a child, she was orphaned in the war zone and was left in the care of Jack-2, who defied his orders to raise her. However, he was eventually destroyed by an explosion, and Jane, then a scientist, determined to rebuild her friend. Nineteen years later, she developed Gun Jack and sent him to the third tournament to retrieve Jack-2's memories. The two managed to break the Mishima Zaibatsu's labs, but were attacked by Dr. Abel, who destroyed Gun Jack when he attempted to protect Jane. Two years later, Jane helped the construction of hundreds of Jack-4 robots with the intention of assassinating Kazuya Mishima, which she did not involved and spared by Kazuya for his use. Subsequently, she developed an upgrade to Jack-4 called Jack-5, whom she sent to participate in the fifth tournament for testing. At the end of the tournament, Jane managed to retrieve the fight data to complete the model. However, when she heard that the Mishima Zaibatsu was building NANCY-MI847J, a complex robot designed for warfare, she built an upgraded Jack model, Jack-6, to counter the robot.

Jane later led a development team to create another upgraded model, Jack-7. Another research team within the company created a bio-enhanced super human, Gigas, whom some saw as more than capable of replacing the Jack series as G Corporation's premier weapon. Both teams decided to enter their weapons in the seventh tournament to determine which one is the best.

The Journalist
Voiced by: Josh Keller

The Journalist is the narrator of the Tekken 7 story mode. An unnamed journalist, who lost his family and home during the war between Mishima Zaibatsu and G Corporation researches the Mishima Clan during the events of King of Iron Fist Tournament 7. He is currently living in a small hotel afterwards, with some of his acquaintances manage to find the darker secrets within G Corp's schematics without being spotted by their watch. Seeking to know the answers behind this endless Mishima conflict war, the journalist went to the library to know more about, starting from Jinpachi Mishima's coup against his greedy son Heihachi Mishima, in the same year after Heihachi killed his wife Kazumi Mishima née Hachijo, then throws a young vengeful Kazuya Mishima off the cliff, which he managed to survive. He is later recruited by Lee Chaolan to join Lars Alexandersson' rebel squad, with the journalist's help, they will find out the answers behind this endless war.

He harbors hatred towards Jin Kazama, who had started the global war. The Journalist was even prepared to kill Jin, but agreed to let him live on the request of Lars, so he could stop the war for some good reason. On the next day, he, Lars, Lee and Alisa Bosconovitch are watching Kazuya's devil form being broadcast live while fighting Akuma at G Corporation's Rooftop by Heihachi, shortly before Heihachi recently activate Doctor Abel's death ray on the said building Kazuya and Akuma fought, presumably kills them, with the public began to turn down their trust towards G Corp, but unaware that Kazuya and Akuma survived the blast.

After Kazuya destroys Doctor Abel's death ray, with the public regain their trust towards G Corp and redeeming the Zaibatsu as the villain once again, he seeks to interview with Heihachi, and is scheduled to meet him at the secret location on the small hut, as Heihachi finally reveals to the journalist about the dark secrets of the Mishima Family and how he killed his wife, Kazumi, especially the origin of the Devil Gene, which Kazuya, and even Jin inherited from her. After the interview, he was taken away by two of his Tekken Force to get him out of the hut and being picked up by Lars soon after. He remains with Lars, Alisa and Lee at another branch of Violet Systems to watch the final battle between Heihachi and his son, Kazuya Mishima at the volcanic pit.

The journalist is last seen typing about the confrontation between both a father and a son before he turns off the lantern once he's done typing his report to end the Story Mode and the credits will roll.

He hopes that the information will be able to reveal the truth, though at a more peaceful time instead.

Legendary Capoeira Master
The Legendary Capoeira Master is the grandfather of Christie Monteiro and the mentor of Eddy Gordo. Before the events of Tekken 3, Eddy willingly imprisoned himself after he was framed by Kazuya for the murder of his parents, where he shared his cell with the Master. He taught Eddy the art of Capoeira during their incarceration. After Eddy was released, the Legendary Capoeira Master (who still had to serve two more years in prison) left a message for him to meet and teach his granddaughter, Christie, Capoeira. He was eventually released two years later, but had become a frail old man. When taken to medical exam, the doctor told Christie and Eddy that he was suffering from a normally incurable sickness that gave him only six months of life expectancy, but also told that a cure could be found with the technology of Mishima Zaibatsu. Thus, his cure became Christie and Eddy's primary reasons for entering the fifth tournament. At the end, neither Christie nor Eddy were able to win, and Eddy, in desperation, took his master to Japan while he joined the Mishima Zaibatsu's ranks with the promise from its leader, Jin Kazama, that he would help him curing his master. Although Jin really did keep Eddy's promise, it turns out not even Mishima Zaibatsu's technology can save the Legendary Capoeira Master, thus without any other option to let the old master dies at the end of the tournament for Eddy and Christie to move on their life, with Eddy angrily leaving his ranks after his many efforts ended all for nothing, now solely remain targeting Kazuya.

Richard Williams
 is a former assassin, the father of Nina and Anna Williams and the maternal grandfather of Steve Fox. He taught his children various assassination martial arts. Richard died sometime after the events of the first Tekken, which further strengthened the rivalry between his children, even after he left his final wish that the two would reconcile. His cause of death is unknown, although in the non-canon OVA Tekken: The Motion Picture, Nina accused Anna of being responsible for his death. In the spin-off Death by Degrees (also non-canon), Richard had died when the sisters were still young and that he was killed when he was trying to protect his children.

Shin Kamiya
Voiced by: Mamoru Miyano (Japanese), David Vincent (English)

 is a character specifically created for the CGI film Tekken: Blood Vengeance, which is an alternate retelling of the events between Tekken 5 and Tekken 6. He was a student of the Mishima Polytechnic High School, where he was a friend of Jin Kazama. During the start of the film, he has moved out to the Kyoto International High School and is apparently very sought after by both Jin and Kazuya Mishima. Ling Xiaoyu, who is sent by Anna Williams to temporarily attend that school to find Shin, first meets him just as he is about to commit suicide by jumping from the roof, which is ultimately a futile attempt. As Xiaoyu and Alisa Bosconovitch (sent by Nina Williams) delve further, it is revealed that Shin, along with his entire class had been experimented by Heihachi Mishima (thought to be dead at that time) with the Devil Gene to test immortality. Shin is the only survivor and he has since been given immortality, which he despises, thus explaining his temptation to take his own life. Shin is eventually kidnapped, which causes Xiaoyu and Alisa to work together to find him, only to find out that he had purposefully lured Heihachi to himself, wanting to take revenge against him for having ruined his life. Shin attempts to punch Heihachi, but he easily braces against it as he breaks Shin's spine, killing him.

Shin was one of the proposed character concepts as a playable character in Tekken Revolution. The developer found it difficult to make him as a playable character due to his lack of knowledge in martial arts and the fact that he died in the film he appeared in, although there was an idea to make him an immortal character. In the character poll, Shin ranked third, above the Zombie Bride and below Eliza and Sexy Female Tekken Force.

Tougou
Voiced by: Hozumi Gōda

 is Lars Alexandersson's friend and fellow member of the Tekken Force of Mishima Zaibatsu. When Lars rebels against the force, Tougou follows suit, and he becomes Lars and Alisa Bosconovitch's source of information during their travel throughout the world in attempt to avoid the Mishima Zaibatsu's manhunt. However, during their raid of G Corporation headquarters (in which Tougou also participates), he is killed by the company's forces, causing Lars to swear to take revenge against the enemies for his death.

While he is not a playable character in any of the games, his cybernetic sword is available as an item move for Lars in Tekken Tag Tournament 2. Tougou was one of the character concepts considered in a poll for a new character to be added in Tekken Revolution. He would have used a style similar to Lars, but with the added abilities to use his sword and to call for air strikes via radio.

Unused characters
Unused characters refer to characters who were once planned to appear in the series as playable fighters, but never made it past the conceptual stages.

Average "Run-of-the-mill" Old Man
An average old man who was not a martial artist, and mentioned as weak. The concept surfaced early within the series, and he may have been reworked into Wang Jinrei.

Female Paul
A female version of Paul Phoenix, who was described as a "very cute girl". The concept was thrown out due to it not making any logical sense.

Ganmi-chan
 was to be a teenage female Sumo wrestler who idolized Ganryu. She was proposed for Tekken Tag Tournament 2, but was discarded in fears that she would overshadow the somewhat-unpopular Ganryu. A character sketch was completed several years ago, and the result was of a "cute anime girl", like those found in The Idolmaster. The sketch was later revealed by series producer Katsuhiro Harada on his Twitter account, in which he stated that if the tweet is retweeted 1000 times, he would convince the staff to attempt her design as a real character.

Giant Praying Mantis
During development of Tekken 3, a game bug caused the joints of a character to move backwards, making the character model deformed and appear like a mutated praying mantis. It inspired the team to make a giant praying mantis creature as a fighter, but by then it was too late to start work on him. Unused data within the Tekken 3 arcade machine shows evidence of him being planned for the game.

Sexy Tekken Force Member
A female Tekken Force member described as "gorgeous" and "sexy". The original concept was proposed for Tekken 5, but her costume was too revealing (the armor being very bikini-like) and the concept was scrapped for fears the rating would increase. The concept resurfaced for Tekken 6, but again went unused. Many different martial arts for her were proposed, including Silat, Krav Maga, Savate, Taekkyon, Systema, and Escrima. In the results of the character poll to determine the new character for Tekken Revolution, she ranked in second place, just below Eliza (who was then known as "Female Vampire").

Sake/Salmon
A salmon out of water. Originally planned for Tekken 3, punch buttons would cause the Salmon to flop around, and the kick buttons would make it release eggs. However, given that the original arcade game charged 100 yen (US$1) to play, playing as a joke character that would inevitably lose would've caused some backlash. Like the praying mantis, leftover data can be found within the Tekken 3 game files. Hacking the game also allows you to play as "Syake", but it is simply Yoshimitsu with Jin Kazama's moves.

Taekwondo Girl
Taekwondo Girl was a female Taekwondo fighter, and was scheduled to appear in Tekken Mobile in a new update. However, due to the game being cancelled, she remains an unused character.

Wild Card
Wild Card is an irregular character appearing only in the arcade version of Tekken. It is essentially the game's "random select" (that picks out different fighters by random to display for the game's demo attraction), but hacking the game reveals it is a standalone character. Playing as Wild Card simply chooses Kazuya Mishima and gives him Yoshimitsu's moves.

Zombie Bride
A zombie bride in a wedding dress. The idea first came up around Tekken 3 as the first zombie in a fighting game. The idea resurfaced again for Tekken 6, as the sister of Miguel, who was killed in an air strike and came back to life. Since the fighting style for a zombie was considered too difficult to create, the idea was scrapped. Zombie Bride ranked fourth in the character poll to determine the new character for Tekken Revolution, just below Shin Kamiya.

References

Tekken
 
Lists of video game characters